Selaphum is a district (amphoe) in the eastern part of Roi Et province, northeastern Thailand.

Geography
Neighboring districts are (from the south clockwise): Phanom Phrai, At Samat, Thung Khao Luang, Thawat Buri, Chiang Khwan, Pho Chai, Phon Thong, and Nong Phok of Roi Et Province; Kut Chum, Sai Mun and Mueang Yasothon of Yasothon province.

History
The district's history goes back to the village Ban Khao Din Bueng Don (บ้านเขาดินบึงโดน), named after an island in the large swamp Bueng Don. In 1879 Mueang Selaphum Nikhom (เสลภูมินิคม) was created. In 1912 it was renamed Selaphum, and converted into a district in 1914.

Administration
The district is divided into 18 sub-districts (tambons), which are further subdivided into 235 villages (mubans). Klang is a township (thesaban tambon) which covers tambon Klang and parts of tambons Na Mueang and Khwan Mueang. There are a further 16 tambon administrative organizations (TAO).

References

Selaphum